The Na-K-Cl cotransporter (NKCC) is a transport protein that aids in the secondary active transport of sodium, potassium, and chloride into cells. In humans there are two isoforms of this membrane transport protein, NKCC1 and NKCC2, encoded by two different genes (SLC12A2 and SLC12A1 respectively). Two isoforms of the NKCC1/Slc12a2 gene result from keeping (isoform 1) or skipping (isoform 2) exon 21 in the final gene product.

NKCC1 is widely distributed throughout the human body; it has important functions in organs that secrete fluids. It is found specifically in the kidney, where it extracts sodium, potassium, and chloride from the urine so they can be reabsorbed into the blood.

Function
NKCC proteins are membrane transport proteins that transport sodium (Na), potassium (K), and chloride (Cl) ions across the cell membrane. Because they move each solute in the same direction, they are considered symporters. They maintain electroneutrality by moving two positively charged solutes (sodium and potassium) alongside two parts of a negatively charged solute (chloride). Thus the stoichiometry of the transported solutes is 1Na:1K:2Cl. However, there is a notable exception in squid giant axon as the symporter in this special cell has a stoichiometry of 2Na:1K:3Cl, although electroneutrality is still maintained.

NKCC1
NKCC1 is widely distributed throughout the body, especially in organs that secrete fluids, called exocrine glands. In cells of these organs, NKCC1 is commonly found in the basolateral membrane, the part of the cell membrane closest to the blood vessels. Its basolateral location gives NKCC1 the ability to transport sodium, potassium, and chloride from the blood into the cell. Other transporters assist in the movement of these solutes out of the cell through its apical surface. The end result is that solutes from the blood, particularly chloride, are secreted into the lumen of these exocrine glands, increasing the luminal concentration of solutes and causing water to be secreted by osmosis.

In addition to exocrine glands, NKCC1 is necessary for establishing the potassium-rich endolymph that bathes part of the cochlea, an organ necessary for hearing. Inhibition of NKCC1, as with furosemide or other loop diuretics, can result in deafness.

NKCC1 is also expressed in many regions of the brain during early development, but not in adulthood. This change in NKCC1 presence seems to be responsible for altering responses to the neurotransmitters GABA and glycine from excitatory to inhibitory, which was suggested to be important for early neuronal development.  As long as NKCC1 transporters are predominantly active, internal chloride concentrations in neurons is raised in comparison with mature chloride concentrations, which is important for GABA and glycine responses, as respective ligand-gated anion channels are permeable to chloride. With higher internal chloride concentrations, outward driving force for this ions increases, and thus channel opening leads to chloride leaving the cell, thereby depolarizing it. Put another way, increasing internal chloride concentration increases the reversal potential for chloride, given by the Nernst equation. Later in development expression of NKCC1 is reduced, while expression of a KCC2 K-Cl cotransporter increased, thus bringing internal chloride concentration in neurons down to adult values.

NKCC2
NKCC2 is specifically found in cells of the thick ascending limb of the loop of Henle and the macula densa in nephrons, the basic functional units of the kidney. Within these cells, NKCC2 resides in the apical membrane abutting the nephron's lumen, which is the hollow space containing urine. It thus serves both in sodium absorption and in tubuloglomerular feedback.

The thick ascending limb of the loop of Henle begins at the deeper portion of the renal outer medulla. Here, the urine has a relatively high concentration of sodium. As urine moves towards the more superficial portion of the thick ascending limb, NKCC2 is the major transport protein by which sodium is reabsorbed from the urine. This outward movement of sodium and the lack of water permeability in the thick ascending limb, creates a more diluted urine. According to the stoichiometry outlined above, each sodium ion reabsorbed brings one potassium ion and two chloride ions. Sodium goes on to be reabsorbed into the blood, where it contributes to the maintenance of blood pressure.

Furosemide and other loop diuretics inhibit the activity of NKCC2, thereby impairing sodium reabsorption in the thick ascending limb of the loop of Henle. The action of these loop diuretics also reduces potassium reabsorption through the NKCC2 cotransporter and consequently increases tubular flow rate which enhances potassium secretion and emphasises the hypokalaemic effect.

Impaired sodium reabsorption increases diuresis by three mechanisms:
 Increases the amount of active osmolytes in urine by decreasing absorption of sodium
 Erases the papillar gradient
 Inhibits tubuloglomerular feedback 
Loop diuretics therefore ultimately result in decreased blood pressure.

The hormone vasopressin stimulates the activity of NKCC2. Vasopressin stimulates sodium chloride reabsorption in the thick ascending limb of the nephron by activating signaling pathways. Vasopressin increases the traffic of NKCC2 to the membrane and phosphorylates some serine and threonine sites on the cytoplasmic N-terminal of the NKCC2 located in the membrane, increasing its activity. Increased NKCC2 activity aids in water reabsorption in the collecting duct through aquaporin 2 channels by creating a hypo-osmotic filtrate.

Genetics
NKCC1 and NKCC2 are encoded by genes on the long arms of chromosomes 5 and 15, respectively.  A loss of function mutation of NKCC2 produces Bartter syndrome, an autosomal recessive disorder characterized by hypokalemic metabolic alkalosis with normal to low blood pressure.

Kinetics
The energy required to move solutes across the cell membrane is provided by the electrochemical gradient of sodium. Sodium's electrochemical gradient is established by the Na-K ATPase, which is an ATP-dependent enzyme. Since NKCC proteins use sodium's gradient, their activity is indirectly dependent on ATP; for this reason, NKCC proteins are said to move solutes by way of secondary active transport.
There are three isoforms of NKCC2 created by alternative splicing (NKCC2A, B and F). Each one of these isoforms is expressed at different portions of the thick ascending limb and they have different affinity for sodium that correlates with its localization. The isoform F is more predominant in the deeper portion of the thick ascending limb, where the sodium concentration is very high. NKCC2F is the isoform with the lowest affinity for sodium and this allows the cotransporter to work at this sodium rich environment. Conversely, NKCC2B is expressed at the more superficial portion of the thick ascending limb and the macula densa, and it has the highest affinity for sodium. This permits NKCC2B to function in this sodium-depleted environment without saturating. The NKCC2A isoform shows an intermediate distribution and affinity for sodium. In this way, NKCC2 is able to function properly along the range of sodium concentrations found along the thick ascending limb.

See also
Cotransport
Cotransporter

References

External links
 

Solute carrier family